Galanter is a surname. Notable people with the surname include:

 Eugene Galanter, academic and psychologist
 Marc Galanter, legal scholar
 Marc Galanter (psychiatrist), American psychiatrist
 Mareva Galanter, French actress
 Neil Galanter, pianist
 Ruth Galanter, Californian politician
 Yale Galanter, US attorney